is a retired Japanese Nippon Professional Baseball player with the Kintetsu Buffaloes.

External links

Living people
1965 births
Baseball people from Nagano Prefecture
Kintetsu Buffaloes players
Japanese baseball players
Nippon Professional Baseball infielders